Mussidia pectinicornella is a species of snout moth in the genus Mussidia. It was described by George Hampson in 1896. It is found in southern and south-eastern Asia from Bhutan to New Guinea, in Australia and Fiji, Taiwan, Japan, southern Europe and in Réunion.

Known food plants of this species are citrus fruits, Rutaceae, (Citrus grandis, Citrus species, Citrus limon) and Sapotaceae (Manilkara zapota).

References

Moths described in 1896
Phycitinae
Moths of Europe
Moths of Australia
Moths of Asia
Moths of Fiji
Moths of Japan
Moths of New Guinea
Moths of Réunion
Moths of Taiwan
Moths of Africa
Taxa named by George Hampson